Figa is a village and municipality in Banská Bystrica Region of southern Slovakia.

History
In historical records, the village was first mentioned in 1294 (1294 Fygey, 1409 Felsewfygey).

Genealogical resources

The records for genealogical research are available at the state archive "Statny Archiv in Banska Bystrica, Slovakia"

 Roman Catholic church records (births/marriages/deaths): 1789-1896 (parish B)
 Lutheran church records (births/marriages/deaths): 1730-1895 (parish B)
 Reformated church records (births/marriages/deaths): 1786-1903 (parish B)

See also
 List of municipalities and towns in Slovakia

External links
https://web.archive.org/web/20090412234949/http://www.statistics.sk/mosmis/eng/run.html
Surnames of living people in Figa

Villages and municipalities in Rimavská Sobota District